Herbert Stein (August 27, 1916 – September 8, 1999) was an American economist, a senior fellow at the American Enterprise Institute, and a member of the board of contributors of The Wall Street Journal. He was the chairman of the Council of Economic Advisers under Richard Nixon and Gerald Ford. From 1974 to 1984, he was the A. Willis Robertson Professor of Economics at the University of Virginia.

Biography

Stein was born on August 27, 1916, in Detroit, Michigan, and his family moved to New York during the Great Depression.  He enrolled in Williams College just before he turned 16. After graduating with Phi Beta Kappa honors, he went to Washington, DC, to work as an economist in various agencies. He received his doctorate of philosophy in economics from the University of Chicago in 1958.

Stein, who died September 8, 1999, in Washington, DC, was married to Mildred Stein, who died in 1997 after 61 years of marriage. He is the father of the lawyer, author, and actor Ben Stein and the writer Rachel Stein. Herbert Stein was also the original writer for the advice column Dear Prudence.

Views
Stein was known as a pragmatic conservative and was referred to as "a liberal's conservative and a conservative's liberal." He was the author of The Fiscal Revolution in America.

In one article, Stein wrote that the people who wore an "Adam Smith necktie" did so to

make a statement of their devotion to the idea of free markets and limited government. What stands out in [Smith's seminal work] Wealth of Nations, however, is that their patron saint was not pure or doctrinaire about this idea. He viewed government intervention in the market with great skepticism. He regarded his exposition of the virtues of the free market as his main contribution to policy, and the purpose for which his economic analysis was developed. Yet he was prepared to accept or propose qualifications to that policy in the specific cases where he judged that their net effect would be beneficial and would not undermine the basically free character of the system.

In Stein's reading, The Wealth of Nations could justify the Food and Drug Administration, the Consumer Product Safety Commission, mandatory employer health benefits, environmentalism, and "discriminatory taxation to deter improper or luxurious behavior."

Stein's Law
Stein propounded Stein's Law, which he expressed in 1986 as "If something cannot go on forever, it will stop." Stein observed this logic in analyzing economic trends (such as rising US federal debt in proportion to GDP, or increasing international balance of payments deficits, in his analysis): if such a process is limited by external factors, there is no urgency for government intervention to stop it, much less to make it stop immediately, but it will stop of its own accord. A paraphrase, not attributed to Stein, is "Trends that can't continue won't."

Bibliography

References

External links

 

1916 births
1999 deaths
20th-century American economists
American Enterprise Institute
20th-century American Jews
Ford administration personnel
Nixon administration personnel
People from Detroit
People from New York (state)
University of Chicago alumni
University of Virginia alumni
University of Virginia faculty
Williams College alumni
Economists from Michigan
Washington, D.C., Republicans
Chairs of the United States Council of Economic Advisers
Member of the Mont Pelerin Society